Lars Patrik Bodén (born 30 June 1967) is a retired Swedish track and field athlete who competed in the javelin throw. He holds the Swedish national record at 89.10 m, which he set on 24 March 1990. He briefly held the world record with this throw until Steve Backley set a new record later the same year.

Seasonal bests by year
1986 - 74.66
1990 - 89.10 (Collegiate throw)
1991 - 79.64
1993 - 88.26
1994 - 83.54
1995 - 80.12
1997 - 86.52
1998 - 85.15
1999 - 84.52
2000 - 85.16

International competitions

References

Profile

1967 births
Living people
Swedish male javelin throwers
Olympic male javelin throwers
Olympic athletes of Sweden
Athletes (track and field) at the 1992 Summer Olympics
Athletes (track and field) at the 2000 Summer Olympics
European Athletics Championships medalists
Japan Championships in Athletics winners
Texas Longhorns men's track and field athletes